Amphisine perpusilla is a species of moth of the family Erebidae, subfamily Arctiinae. It is found on Borneo and Sumatra. The habitat consists of dipterocarp forests and lower montane forests.

References

Nudariina
Moths of Asia
Moths described in 1862